2,8-Dihydroxyadenine is a derivative of adenine which accumulates in 2,8 dihydroxy-adenine urolithiasis. The poorly soluble purine 2,8-dihydroxyadenine is excreted in the urine because of a deficiency in the adenine salvage enzyme adenine phosphoribosyltransferase. The defect is inherited as an autosomal recessive trait; the homozygous state is associated with high urinary levels of 2,8-dihydroxyadenine and with crystalluria, calculus formation, and potential nephrotoxicity. The condition primarily presents as renal obstructive disease, but some patients have presented with advanced kidney failure. Allopurinol therapy appears to be effective. 2, 8-dihydroxyadenine formation can be easily controlled with allopurinol, which is administered in a dose of 300 mg/day in adults (10 mg/kg/day in children) in the absence of kidney failure.

References

 
 
 

Purines